The Pathfinder-class survey ships are owned by the United States Navy and operated by Military Sealift Command for the Naval Oceanographic Office ("NAVOCEANO").  They have mostly civilian crews, including scientists from NAVOCEANO.

The Pathfinder-class survey ships have three multipurpose cranes and five winches plus a variety of oceanographic equipment including multi-beam echo-sounders, towed sonars and expendable sensors. HSLs carry SIMRAD high-frequency active hull-mounted and side scan sonars. USNS Maury, the most recent addition to the survey ship fleet, is equipped with an  moon pool for deploying and retrieving a variety of mission systems, including autonomous underwater vehicles (AUV).

The original contract for the Pathfinder class of surveying ships was awarded in January 1991 for two ships with an option for a third, which was taken up May 29, 1992. A fourth ship was ordered in October 1994 with an option for two more. A fifth ship was ordered January 15, 1997. Construction began on the sixth ship in the class in 1999. By early 2002, six ships had been delivered and were performing active missions for MSC. The contract for a seventh ship, USNS Maury, was awarded in December 2009. In August 2014, USNS Sumner, was deactivated, and USNS Maury was delivered on February 16, 2016, restoring the survey fleet to six ships. On November 19, 2018, the Navy awarded a contract for advanced work for an eighth Pathfinder-class ship.

Ships
There are eight ships in the Pathfinder class:

 
  (struck in 2014, scheduled for disposal)
 
 
 
 
  (formerly  until renamed on 8 March 2023)

References

 
Auxiliary ship classes of the United States Navy
Auxiliary research ship classes